There are many hundreds of villas in the Italian city of Naples. The landscapes of the Gulf of Naples have always encouraged this type of structure. Among them are the Villa Donn'Anna, built in the early 15th century and rebuilt in the 1640s, and the Villa Rosebery, which is one of the official residences of the President of Italy and is named after the 5th Earl of Rosebery, the former British Prime Minister who bought it in 1897.

Roman origins 
The Gulf of Naples was a particular locus of the development of Roman villas from roughly 50 BCE to 200 CE, where they were built as retreats and status symbols by senators and the like. Of the many villas of this era discovered in Boscoreale, Naples, buried in the eruption of Mount Vesuvius that also buried Pompeii, one now visible is the Villa Regina. That was a villa rustica – a rustic villa, as distinguished from a villa urbana, which would have been grander. The work of John D'Arms and particularly his book Romans on the Bay of Naples have been important in understanding the history and nature of the Roman Villa. In the Gulf of Naples, well-preserved examples include the Villa of the Papyri, Villa Poppaea, and, at Stabiae, Villa Arianna A and B and Villa San Marco.

Examples 

 Villa Carafa of Belvedere
 
  (Villa Rae)
 Villa Donn'Anna (originally La Villa Sirena)
 
 
 Villa Floridiana
 Villa Giulia
 
 
 
 
 
 Villa Pignatelli
 Poggio Reale (villa)
 Villa Regina, Boscoreale
 
 Villa Rocca Matilde
 
 Villa Rosebery

Gallery

See also 
 :Category:Palaces in Naples

References

Further reading 

 
 

 
Naples villas